Anthony Reddick (born December 26, 1985) is a defensive back who is currently a free-agent. Reddick was most recently a member of the BC Lions of the Canadian Football League. Reddick signed as a free agent with the Lions on April 27, 2010. He played college football for the Miami Hurricanes. In a 2006 brawl, Reddick swung his helmet as a weapon at players on the opposing team. He was one of 31 players suspended for the incident.

After three seasons with the BC Lions, Reddick was released on March 26, 2013.

References

External links
BC Lions bio

1985 births
Living people
African-American players of Canadian football
American players of Canadian football
BC Lions players
Canadian football defensive linemen
Players of Canadian football from Fort Lauderdale, Florida
21st-century African-American sportspeople
20th-century African-American people